CBS Playhouse is an American anthology drama television series that aired on CBS from 1967 to 1970. Airing twelve plays over the course of its run, the series won ten Primetime Emmy Awards and featured many noteworthy actors and playwrights.

History

The CBS Playhouse series was announced in 1966, with CBS announcing a $500,000 outlay for new scripts to film.  CBS was specifically looking to "encourage authors to write original and significant dramas for television," and offered $25,000 per optioned script.  This occurred shortly after ABC announced its dramatic arts program ABC Stage 67, along with many CBS dramas.

Playhouse ultimately commissioned thirteen playwrights to write scripts for the series.  The first program aired in 1967, called The Final War of Olly Winter starring Ivan Dixon and written by noted playwright Ronald Ribman.  According to CBS, over 30 million people watched the broadcast, making it a popular hit for the time.

Twelve broadcasts ultimately occurred before production stopped due to lack of sponsorship funding.  CBS would later revive the genre in CBS Playhouse 90, which would refer back to both CBS Playhouse and the early drama series Playhouse 90 that broadcast in the late 1950s.

Episodes
CBS broadcast twelve teleplays over the three television seasons between 1967 and 1970.

1967-68 Season

 The Final War of Olly Winter
 Do Not Go Gentle into That Good Night
 Dear Friends
 My Father and My Mother
 Secrets

1968-69 Season

 The People Next Door
 Saturday Adoption
 The Experiment
 Shadow Game

1969-70 Season

 Appalachian Autumn
 Sadbird
 The Day Before Sunday

Episode status
The broadcasts have been preserved in a variety of archives, with all twelve broadcasts archived between the Paley Center for Media, the UCLA film archive, and the Peabody Awards Collection.

Awards
The CBS Playhouse series of broadcasts were nominated for a number of awards over the course of its run.  In total, the dramatic series was nominated for twenty-eight Primetime Emmy Awards, including ten wins, and seven Directors Guild of America awards, including three wins.  CBS Playhouse was also honored with a Peabody Award in 1967.

References

External links
CBS Playhouse at CVTA with episode list
 

1967 American television series debuts
1970 American television series endings
1960s American anthology television series
1970s American anthology television series
1960s American drama television series
1970s American drama television series
CBS original programming
English-language television shows
Peabody Award-winning television programs